Alabama Port, also sometimes known as Port Alabama, is an unincorporated community on Mon Louis Island, in Mobile County, Alabama, United States.

Geography

Demographics

Alabama Port Precinct (1880)

Alabama Port has never reported separately as an unincorporated community on the U.S. Census. However, in 1880, the 19th precinct of Mobile County bore its name, and had 417 residents. The name of the precinct was changed in 1890 to Cedar Point, then Heron Bayou and Dauphin Island in 1900, simply Heron Bayou for 1910-20 and "Herron Bay" for 1930–50. It was consolidated under the Bayou La Batre census division in 1960.

References

Unincorporated communities in Alabama
Unincorporated communities in Mobile County, Alabama
Populated coastal places in Alabama